Robert II de Sablé  (died 1165) was the son of Lisiard of Sable and Thiphaine of Briole.

Robert and his father Lisiard, Lord of Sablé, both fought against the Counts of Anjou, Fulk V and Geoffrey Plantagenet. This conflict lasted until 1145, when he was defeated in battle and would remain a loyal subject of the Counts of Anjou.

Marriage and family
Robert married Hersende of Anthenaise with whom he had:
Marguerite
Robert IV of Sablé, Grand Master of the Knights Templar

Notes

References

Sources

House of Sablé